Edward Detkens (1885–1942) was a Polish and Roman Catholic priest. He was imprisoned in the Nazi Sachsenhausen concentration camp. He is one of the 108 Martyrs of World War II. He is buried at Powązki Cemetery.

See also 
List of Nazi-German concentration camps
The Holocaust in Poland
World War II casualties of Poland

References

1885 births
1942 deaths
20th-century Polish Roman Catholic priests
Pilgrimage
Sachsenhausen concentration camp prisoners
Polish people who died in Nazi concentration camps
Burials at Powązki Cemetery
108 Blessed Polish Martyrs